Enit Sadiku (born 14 July 1998) is a Swiss professional footballer who plays as a right-back for FC Uster.

Career statistics

Club

Notes

References

1998 births
Swiss people of Kosovan descent
Footballers from Zürich
Living people
Swiss men's footballers
Association football defenders
FC Zürich players
Swiss Promotion League players
Swiss Super League players
Swiss 1. Liga (football) players